Haughin Creek is a  long second-order tributary to Big Anne Creek in Keya Paha County, Nebraska.  This is the only stream of this name in the United States.

Watershed

See also

List of rivers of Nebraska

References

Rivers of Keya Paha County, Nebraska
Rivers of Nebraska